The Trade with France Act 1704 (3 & 4 Anne, c. 12) was an Act passed by the Parliament of England that prohibited the importation of French goods into England.

References

1704 in law
Acts of the Parliament of England
1704 in England
Protectionism